Barchatus cirrhosus is a species of toadfish native to the western Indian Ocean and the Red Sea. It is one of the species of toadfishes known to have venomous spines.

References

Batrachoididae
Taxa named by Carl Benjamin Klunzinger
Fish described in 1871